Flight 372 may refer to:
Ethiopian Airlines Flight 372, crashed on 15 July 1960
Dagestan Airlines Flight 372, crashed on 4 December 2010

0372